The 2013–14 Premier Arena Soccer League season consists of 43 teams grouped into 6 divisions across the US. The Premier Arena Soccer League continues to serve as the developmental league to the Professional Arena Soccer League.

Standings
As of March 5, 2014

(Bold Division Winner, automatic National Finals Qualifier)

Division Playoffs
Northwest Division Semifinals 
Sat. Feb. 22, 7pm: Kitsap Pumas 11, Yamhill County Crew 5
Sat. Feb. 22, 8pm: Tacoma Galaxy 8, Arlington Aviators 4  
Division Championship "Friendly" (Tacoma is official Division Champion regardless of outcome, as Kitsap is unable to travel to Nationals)
Sat. Mar. 8, 8:30pm: Tacoma Galaxy 10, Kitsap Pumas 2 

South Central Division Semifinals 
Sat. Mar. 1, 4:30pm: Vitesse Dallas 6, Austin FC 5 
Sat. Mar. 1, 5:30pm: Texas Xtreme 12, Austin Gunners 4 
Finals 
Sun. Mar. 2, 1:00pm: Vitesse Dallas 8, Texas Xtreme 5

2013-14 PASL-Premier Finals
The finals will be played in Hoffman Estates, Illinois, on March 15–16, 2014. Matches will be played at both the Grand Sports Arena and the Sears Centre.

Preliminary Round: Sat. March 15, 2014 

@ Grand Sports Arena
9:00am - Chicago Mustangs Premier 6, Illinois Fire 0
9:00am - Tacoma Galaxy 3, Vitesse Dallas 3
9:45am - River City Saints 4, Springfield Demize 4
9:45am - Colorado Blizzard 7, FC Indiana Lions 6
10:30am - Tacoma Galaxy 8, Illinois Fire 4
10:30am - Vitesse Dallas 5, Chicago Mustangs Premier 1
11:15am - Colorado Blizzard 3, Springfield Demize 2 
11:15am - River City Saints 6, FC Indiana Lions 2 
@ Sears Centre
1:00pm - Vitesse Dallas 8, Illinois Fire 2 
1:45pm - Chicago Mustangs Premier 3, Tacoma Galaxy 1
2:30pm - FC Indiana Lions 4, Springfield Demize 3
3:15pm - River City Saints 5, Colorado Blizzard 3

Knockout Round

Sun. March 16, 2014 Semifinals (@ Sears Centre)
11:00am - Vitesse Dallas 5, Colorado Blizzard 1
Noon - Chicago Mustangs Premier 5, River City Saints 1

Finals (@ Sears Centre)
1:15pm - Chicago Mustangs Premier 7, Vitesse Dallas 4

References

2013-2014
Premier
Premier